Elisabeth Cuypers (unknown – unknown) was a Belgian chess player, Belgian Women's Chess Championship four-times winner.

Biography
From the early 1940s to the end of 1960s, Elisabeth Cuypers was one of the leading chess players in the Belgium. Four times she won the Belgian Women's Chess Championships: 1941, 1943, 1945 and 1968. Also Elisabeth Cuypers won silver (1951) un bronze (1962) medals in this tournament.

Elisabeth Cuypers played for Belgium in the Women's Chess Olympiads:
 In 1957, at first board in the 1st Chess Olympiad (women) in Emmen (+1, =0, -10),
 In 1963, at second board in the 2nd Chess Olympiad (women) in Split (+2, =1, -5).

References

External links
 
 Elisabeth Cuypers chess games at 365Chess.com

Year of birth missing
Year of death missing
Belgian chess players
Chess Olympiad competitors
20th-century chess players